Po' Bandino is a frazione of the comune of Città della Pieve in the Province of Perugia, Umbria, central Italy. It stands at an elevation of 252 metres above sea level. At the time of the Istat census of 2001 it had 834 inhabitants.

References 

Frazioni of the Province of Perugia